Amphidromus adamsii is a species of air-breathing land snail, a terrestrial pulmonate gastropod mollusk in the family Camaenidae.

The variety Amphidromus adamsii var. obliquatus E. von Martens, 1903  is a taxon inquirendum,(use in recent literature currently undocumented)

Distribution
The type species was found in Borneo.

References

 Adams, A. (1848). Notes from a journal of research into the natural history of the countries visited during the Voyage of H.M.S. Samarang, under the command of Captain Sir E. Belcher, C.B. 2: 223-532

External links 

adamsii
Gastropods described in 1848